was a son of Azai Sukemasa and the second head of the Azai clan.

Hisamasa became the head of the clan in 1542 after his father died, but unlike his father, he was never a strong leader. Losing domains against Rokkaku clan, he instead became a Rokkaku retainer. Hisamasa's retainers had enough and after his son Azai Nagamasa won the Battle of Norada against a force at least twice the size of his led by Rokkaku Yoshikata to win back independence, they forced Hisamasa into retirement.

Yet, this retirement was not complete and Hisamasa managed to hold some sway of the clan. This surfaced in 1570 after Oda Nobunaga who was allied with his son, Azai Nagamasa, attacked Asakura Yoshikage who had supported Hisamasa against enemies like the Rokkaku clan. Hating Nobunaga for his personality, Hisamasa demanded that the Azai clan pay back the support of Asakura clan and forced a war by breaking the alliance. It is thought that Nagamasa opposed him and believed that the alliance could somehow be mended over time since he refused to divorce his wife, Oichi, but he failed to gain enough support to overturn Hisamasa.

On 1573, Odani Castle was besieged by Nobunaga's forces, and facing a loss Hisamasa committed seppuku.

Family
Father: Azai Sukemasa (1491-1542)
Son: Azai Nagamasa (1545-1573)
Daughter: Kyōgoku Maria (1543-1618)

References

1524 births
1573 deaths
Suicides by seppuku
Azai clan